This is a list of events that took place in the year 2007 in Azerbaijan.

Incumbents
 President: Ilham Aliyev
 Prime Minister: Artur Rasizade
 Speaker: Ogtay Asadov

Events

June

June 7: President of the United States George W. Bush and President of Russia Vladimir Putin meet to discuss missile defense. Putin, in a minor reversal of recent rhetoric regarding Bush's European missile shield plans, suggests placing a radar installation in Azerbaijan.

August

August 29: Ten people are trapped alive in a collapsed apartment building in Baku, Azerbaijan with at least twelve people having died.

October

October 29: The UK embassy in Baku, Azerbaijan, is closed as a precaution after a terrorist attack in the city is prevented.  The US embassy also closes its doors after the Azerbaijan Government reports of the thwarting of a "large-scale, horrifying terror attack."

November
November 4: Baku–Gazakh motorway minibus crash took place, becoming the country's heaviest road accident in the past ten years.

Deaths

References

 
Azerbaijan
Azerbaijan